The dragon houses (Drakospita) or Draga (Δραγκά) are some twenty large, ruined buildings found in the south of the island of Euboea, Greece. They were built with massive stone blocks without mortar  and large stone slabs  for the  roofs. The Dragon House on Mount Ochi (Δρακόσπιτο της Όχης), north of Karystos is the most famous and well preserved. Other notable buildings are located in Palli-Lakka (Πάλλη-Λάκκα Δραγκά) and in Kapsala. In local folklore "dragons" are not only reptilian monsters but also beings with superhuman powers. 
 
There is no accepted theory  about the identity of the builders nor an agreed estimation on their dating. No mention is identified in classical texts and the first account is from the 18th-century British geologist, traveller and writer John Hawkins The first detailed account, after Hawkins was in 1842 by the German archaeologist H.N. Ulrichs. 

The French classical scholar Jules Girard visited Euboea and described the Ochi dragon house, and provided further descriptions of the three Palli-Lakka Dragon houses

The Swiss archaeologist Karl Reber has tracked down all reported buildings and published a report in 2010.

Gallery

References 

Ruins in Greece
Euboea
Buildings and structures in Central Greece
Megalithic monuments